Liberty Township is one of the fourteen townships of Union County, Ohio, United States.  The 2010 census found 1,948 people in the township.

Geography
Located in the western part of the county, it borders the following townships:
York Township - north
Taylor Township - east
Paris Township - southeast
Allen Township - south
Zane Township, Logan County - southwest
Perry Township, Logan County - west

No municipalities are located in Liberty Township, although the unincorporated community of Raymond lies in the township's east.

Name and history
Liberty Township was organized in 1822. It is one of twenty-five Liberty Townships statewide.

Government
The township is governed by a three-member board of trustees, who are elected in November of odd-numbered years to a four-year term beginning on the following January 1. Two are elected in the year after the presidential election and one is elected in the year before it. There is also an elected township fiscal officer, who serves a four-year term beginning on April 1 of the year after the election, which is held in November of the year before the presidential election. Vacancies in the fiscal officership or on the board of trustees are filled by the remaining trustees.

References

External links
Township website
County website

Townships in Union County, Ohio
Townships in Ohio